Buckner Glacier is located on the south slope of Buckner Mountain, North Cascades National Park in the U.S. state of Washington. Buckner Mountain is situated between the glacier and the much larger Boston Glacier to the north.

See also
List of glaciers in the United States

References

Glaciers of the North Cascades
Glaciers of Chelan County, Washington
Glaciers of Washington (state)